Dalophis boulengeri is an eel in the family Ophichthidae (worm/snake eels). It was described by Jacques Blache, Jean Cadenat and Alfred Stauch in 1970. It is a tropical, marine eel which is known from the eastern central and southeastern Atlantic Ocean, including Angola, Benin, the Democratic Republic of the Congo, Cameroon, Côte d'Ivoire, Equatorial Guinea, Guinea, Guinea-Bissau, Ghana, Gabon, Gambia, Liberia, Mauritania, Nigeria, Sierra Leone, Senegal, and Togo. It is active at night, and inhabits burrows during the daytime, leaving its head exposed. Males can reach a maximum total length of 57.4 centimetres, but more commonly reach a TL of 47.5 cm.

Due to its wide distribution and lack of known threats, the IUCN redlist currently lists Dalophis boulengeri as Least Concern. Due to a lack of information on its distribution in Mauritania, it is listed as Data Deficient for Northern Africa.

References

Ophichthidae
Fish of the Atlantic Ocean
Fish described in 1970
Taxa named by Jean Cadenat